Seniehun (also, Bahal, Senbehun, and Senjehun) is a village in the Southern Province, Sierra Leone.

References
 

Villages in Sierra Leone